Zeng Qi (1892 – May 7, 1951) was a politician in Republican China. He was the founder and chairman of the Young China Party, the third largest party (behind the Nationalist Party and the Communist Party) in China at the time.

1892 births
1951 deaths
Young China Party politicians
Chinese journalists
20th-century journalists